Bristol Township is the smallest township in Kendall County, Illinois. As of the 2010 census, its population was 26,230 and it contained 9,229 housing units.

Geography

U.S. Route 30 and U.S. Route 34 run east to west through the township.  Yorkville covers much of the township.

The township is named after the Bristol family.

Cities and towns
 Montgomery (partial)
 Oswego (partial)
 Yorkville (majority)

Unincorporated towns
 Bristol

Demographics

Government
The township is governed by an elected Town Board of a Supervisor and four Trustees.  The Township also has an elected Assessor, Clerk, and Highway Commissioner.

Notes

References
 
 

1849 establishments in Illinois
Townships in Kendall County, Illinois
Townships in Illinois